The Midshipman  is a 1925 American silent romantic drama film directed by Christy Cabanne. The film stars Ramon Novarro and Harriet Hammond. Joan Crawford had an early uncredited role as an extra.

Plot
James Randall (Novarro), a second year upperclassman at the Naval Academy, befriends plebe Ted Lawrence (Barry). At an Academy dance, James meets and falls in love with Ted's sister Patricia (Hammond). She is engaged to Basil Courtney (Kent), a wealthy reprobate who arranges with Rita (Key) to discredit James. On the night of the big dance, Rita goes to the guardhouse where James is scheduled to be on duty and arranges to be found with him. However, Ted has taken his place on duty, however, and James sees Ted with Rita in the guardhouse. Honorbound to report Ted for violation of Academy rules, James decides instead to resign. Courtney abducts Patricia on his yacht, and James rescues her. James discovers Rita's complicity in Courtney's schemes and decides to stay at the Academy, marrying Patricia upon his graduation.

Cast

Production
Much of The Midshipman was filmed on location at the United States Naval Academy with the cooperation of the Department of the Navy, allowing the use of the Brigade of Midshipmen as extras. For the graduation scene, Novarro receives the diploma from Secretary of the Navy Curtis D. Wilbur.

Preservation
A print of The Midshipman is preserved in the George Eastman Museum Motion Picture Collection.

References

External links

Stills at silenthollywood.com
Still in Bancroft Hall at USNA collection
Advertising pamphlet at silentfilmstillarchive.com
Stills with Joan Crawford at joancrawfordbest.com

1925 films
American silent feature films
American romantic drama films
Metro-Goldwyn-Mayer films
American black-and-white films
Films directed by Christy Cabanne
1925 romantic drama films
1920s American films
Silent romantic drama films
Silent American drama films